Crocidocnemis pellucidalis is a moth in the family Crambidae. It was described by Heinrich Benno Möschler in 1890. It is found in Cuba, Puerto Rico, Panama, Costa Rica, Brazil and Argentina. It is also found in the southern United States, where it has been recorded from Florida and Texas.

References

Moths described in 1890
Spilomelinae